Gilmore is an unincorporated community in St. Charles County, in the U.S. state of Missouri.

History
A post office called Gilmore was established in 1884, and remained in operation until 1959. Gilmore was named for Thomas Gilmore, an early settler who was one of a company to march against the British at Rock Island and who was killed by Indians.

References

Unincorporated communities in Missouri
Unincorporated communities in St. Charles County, Missouri